Norman William Sidey (31 May 1907 – 1969) was an English footballer who played for Arsenal. He was part of the Arsenal sides that won the FA Charity Shield in 1933 and 1934.

References

1907 births
1996 deaths
English footballers
Association football defenders
English Football League players
Nunhead F.C. players
Arsenal F.C. players